Chasia is a former municipality in the Trikala regional unit, Thessaly, Greece. Since the 2011 local government reform it is part of the municipality Meteora, of which it is a municipal unit. The municipal unit has an area of 291.753 km2. Population 2,861 (2011).

References

Populated places in Trikala (regional unit)